Patrick Wolfe (1949 – 18 February 2017) was an Australian historian and scholar who made significant contributions to several academic fields, including anthropology, genocide studies, Indigenous studies, and the historiography of race, colonialism, and imperialism. He is often credited with establishing the field of settler colonial studies.

About 
Wolfe was born to an Irish Catholic and German Jewish Yorkshire family, and educated Jesuit. In the 1970s he collaborated with Sibnarayan Ray and Greg Dening as an undergraduate. Along with Maurice Bloch, he began his post-graduate studies in social anthropology at the London School of Economics and Political Science. He then went on to pursue his doctorate with Greg Dening under the supervision of Dipesh Chakrabarty. As a doctoral student he taught Aboriginal history at the University of Melbourne. He was associated with a number of universities in Australia as a teacher and researcher, including Victoria University and La Trobe University. Wolfe held fellowships at Harvard and Stanford among other places. He never held an academic tenure or a permanent university position. His research spanned race and colonialism around the world.

Wolfe's home was Healesville on Wurundjeri country. At his memorial service, Aunty Joy Murphy Wandin, a Wurundjeri Elder, stated that Wolfe was a cherished friend of the Wurundjeri people.

Works 
Monographs:
 Settler Colonialism and the Transformation of Anthropology (1999)
 Traces of History: Elementary Structures of Race (2016)
Edited Collections:
 The Settler Complex: Recuperating Binarism in Colonial Studies (editor Patrick Wolfe, 2016)
 Sovereignty: Frontiers of Possibility, co-edited by Julie Evans, Ann Genovese, Alexander Reilly, and Patrick Wolfe (2012)

References 

Australian historians
Australian anthropologists
Historians of colonialism
Historians of genocides
Historians of Australia
Academics from Yorkshire
2016 deaths
1949 births
Alumni of the London School of Economics
University of Melbourne alumni
Academic staff of La Trobe University
Academic staff of the Victoria University, Melbourne
Australian indigenous rights activists
Australian people of German-Jewish descent
Australian people of Irish descent